Hameed Ullah Jan Afridi is a Pakistani politician who had been a member of the National Assembly of Pakistan from 2008 to 2013.

Political career
He was elected to the Senate of Pakistan in 2003 where he served until 2007.

He was elected to the National Assembly of Pakistan from Constituency NA-46 (Tribal Area-XI) as an independent candidate in 2008 Pakistani general election. from 2008 to 2011. He received 5,660 votes and defeated an independent candidate, Mohammad Saeed Afridi. In March 2008, he was inducted into the federal cabinet of Prime Minister Yousaf Raza Gillani and was appointed as Federal Minister for Environment where he continued to serve until February 2011.

He ran for the seat of the National Assembly from Constituency NA-46 (Tribal Area-XI) as an independent candidate in 2013 Pakistani general election but was unsuccessful. He received 3,342 votes and lost the seat to Nasir Khan Afridi.

References

People from Khyber District
Pakistani MNAs 2008–2013
Living people
Year of birth missing (living people)